The Teesside Development Corporation was a government-backed development corporation that was established in 1987 to fund and manage regeneration projects in the former county of Cleveland in North East England.

The Teesside Development Corporation developed several schemes, many on former industrial land on both sides of the River Tees and around Hartlepool ranging from housing, commercial, light industrial and leisure projects.
Its flagship developments included the Tees Barrage, Hartlepool Marina, Teesside Park and Teesdale Business Park.
During its 11-year lifetime 4.6m sq ft of non-housing development and 1,306 housing units were built.
Around 12,226 new jobs were created and some £1,089m of private finance was leveraged in.
The chairman was Sir Ron Norman and the chief executive was Duncan Hall; the deputy chairman was the former Member of Parliament for Easington, Lord Dormand of Easington.

Most of its roles were taken over by the four local authorities of Hartlepool, Stockton-on-Tees, Middlesbrough, and Redcar and Cleveland as well as the regional development agency OneNorthEast and English Partnerships on its dissolution in 1998.

The Corporation was later condemned by Labour MP Ashok Kumar for having left a legacy of limited and "often inappropriate and threadbare development".

The areas it regenerated are clearly marked by distinctive TDC statues.

See also
South Tees Development Corporation
Tees Valley Regeneration

References 

Companies based in Middlesbrough
Redcar and Cleveland
Organisations based in the Borough of Hartlepool
Borough of Stockton-on-Tees
Cleveland, England
Organisations based in North Yorkshire
Defunct public bodies of the United Kingdom
Development Corporations of the United Kingdom